Grachan Moncur may refer to:
 Grachan Moncur II (1915–1996), jazz bassist and father of Grachan Moncur III
 Grachan Moncur III (1937–2022), jazz trombonist